"Georgia Porcupine" is a popular jazz instrumental written and performed by pianist George Fischoff. Released as a single, the song was a hit for Fischoff in 1974, peaking at No. 10 on the July 20, 1974, Easy Listening chart in Billboard magazine.

The song has been covered by The Happy Piano, David Lee, and Tommy Johnson & Son.

References 

1974 singles
1974 songs
United Artists Records singles
Songs written by George Fischoff
1970s instrumentals